The Sodus Central School District is a public school district in New York, United States. It serves approximately 1400 students in the town of Sodus in Wayne County, and has a staff of 200.

The average class size is 20 students (all grades). The student-teacher ratio is 13:1 (elementary), 17:1 (middle-high school).

The district motto is "Excellence in Education". The school's mascot is the Sodus Spartan.  Sodus has modified, junior varsity, and varsity sports, based on three sport seasons.  Fall sports include soccer for boys and girls, cross country, and girls' tennis.  Winter sports include wrestling (coached by Dastyck), co-ed swimming, indoor track, basketball, and skiing.  Spring sports include track and field, boys' tennis, softball, and baseball.

The school has a weight room, a pool (Olympic length but 12 1/2 feet at its deepest spot, with diving boards), three gyms in the high-middle school complex, and a playground at the middle school next to the administrative offices.  The primary school has a gym, a playground and a large field with a softball field.  Near the track is the main softball field, and the baseball field is near that.

The school teaches all courses which are standard in New York, plus Spanish, technical courses and parenting classes, plus accelerated courses.  Sodus has student teachers that come in for about one quarter of the year.  The school also has a science teacher who has her doctorate.

Nelson Kise is the Superintendent of the school district as of 2018.

Board of Education
The Board of Education consists of seven members who serve rotating three-year terms. Elections are held each May for board members and to vote on the school district budget.

Current board members (2021-2022) are:
 Laura Steffler-Alampi-President
 Jason Walters
 Alden Atkins
 Tony Cincinello
 Jeff Martinez
 Brian Wagner
 Sarah Williams

Schools
The district's middle and high schools are located on a common campus on Mill Street, with the elementary school nearby on Route 88, in the town of Sodus.

Elementary schools
Sodus Elementary School (PK-3)

Middle school
 Sodus Middle School (4-6)

High school
 Sodus High School (7-12)

Performance
The district's 90% graduation rate exceeds the state standard of 55%.

Sports
Sodus won the boys New York state class C basketball championship in 2005 led by Gregg Logins Jr
Sodus won the boys Section V championship in soccer in class C1 2018

References

External links
 
 New York State School Boards Association

School districts in New York (state)
Education in Wayne County, New York